The Comité de Football des Îles du Nord is the official football federation of the French half of the island of Saint Martin and Saint Barthélemy island, although Saint Barthélemy now has its own Comité de Football de Saint Barthélemy.

See also
Saint-Martin Championships
Saint Martin national football team

References

External links
Saint Martin at CONCACAF site

Saint Martin
Football in the Collectivity of Saint Martin
Football governing bodies in Overseas France
Sports organizations established in 1986